Siddipet Lok Sabha constituency was one of the 42 Lok Sabha (parliamentary) constituencies in Andhra Pradesh till 2008.

Members of Parliament

Election results

2004

See also
 Medak district
 List of Constituencies of the Lok Sabha

References

Medak district
Siddipet
Former constituencies of the Lok Sabha
2008 disestablishments in India
Constituencies disestablished in 2008
Former Lok Sabha constituencies of Andhra Pradesh